Jeffrey W. Frame is an American atmospheric scientist known for observational and modeling studies of severe convective storms and for teaching meteorology. He was a scientist for VORTEX2 and other field research programs.

Frame is from Michigan and graduated summa cum laude from the University of Michigan (UM) with a B.S. in Atmospheric, Oceanic, and Space Sciences in 2001. Moving on to the Pennsylvania State University (PSU) for graduate studies, he earned a M.S. in 2003 with the thesis The Interaction of Simulated Squall Lines with Complex Terrain and a Ph.D. in 2008 with the dissertation The Dynamical Impact of Anvil Shading on Simulated Supercell Thunderstorms. Since 2010 he has been an instructor and assistant professor at the University of Illinois at Urbana-Champaign (UIUC). Frame is a member of the American Meteorological Society (AMS) and Chi Epsilon Pi. He participated in the International H2O Project (IHOP), Radar Observations of Tornadoes and Thunderstorms Experiment (ROTATE), Verification of the Origin of Rotation in Tornadoes Experiment 2 (VORTEX2), co-PI of Ontario Winter Lake-effect Storms (OWLeS), and other field experiments. He participated with the Doppler on Wheels (DOW) team for the ROTATE, VORTEX2, and OWLeS projects and as mobile mesonet leader for IHOP. He also participated in the DOW's deployment for teaching purposes at UIUC.

References

External links
 UIUC page
 Twitter account

University of Michigan College of Engineering alumni
Penn State College of Earth and Mineral Sciences alumni
University of Illinois Urbana-Champaign faculty
American meteorologists
Storm chasers
Living people
Year of birth missing (living people)